Welcome to My Heart is the second studio album by Australian singer-songwriter Angus Gill. It was released on 20 September 2020 on ABC/Universal. The album peaked at #2 on the ARIA Australian Country Albums Chart and was nominated for Traditional Country Album of the Year at the 2020 Country Music Awards of Australia.

Track listing

Charts

References

2019 albums
Angus Gill albums